Kundrathur Murugan Temple is a Hindu temple located in Kundrathur, a suburb of Chennai in the Kancheepuram district of Tamil Nadu.
 
According to Hindu mythology, Lord Subramaniar (Murugan) stayed on the hill during his travels from Tiruporur to Tiruttanigai. This place is also known as South Thanigai since Lord Subramaniar is standing facing the direction of north, facing Thanigai.

Architecture
This is the only Murugan temple in Tamil Nadu where the God is standing in a north facing direction. This temple was constructed by King Kulothunga Chola II. The speciality of this temple is that Lord Subramaniar can be seen only with one Goddess at a time even though he is there along with both the Goddesses. If the God is viewed from one side he can be seen along with Goddess Valli and viewed from the other side, he can be seen along with Goddess Deivayanai.

There are 84 steps to reach this hill temple.

Vehicles (cars, bikes, autos) can also be driven up the hill right up to the front of the temple on the hill, for those that cannot walk up the 84 steps.
The temple is very close to the outer ring road for those that need faster accessibility to the temple.
Pallavaram to Kundrathur there are a lot of buses too but do not go all the way to the temple.

History 

Once winning the demons in Thiruporur, Lord Muruga went to Thirutani in a joyous spirit. He placed a Siva Linga, performed pooja and meditated deep. The temple was subsequently constructed by the great Chola King Kulothunga Chola. Lord Siva, worshiped by Lord Muruga graces the worshipers in the name of Kandaleeswarar in a separate shrine.

See also
 Religion in Chennai
 Heritage structures in Chennai

References

Hindu temples in Chennai	 
Hindu temples in Kanchipuram district